The Ipswich Water Works Company was formed by the merger of nine private water companies in 1854. The previous year the proposal by Ipswich Corporation to gain control of the rights to supply water to the town had been met by protests from residents and water suppliers. The company was bought by Ipswich Corporation in 1892, who then turned it into the Ipswich Corporation Waterworks.

Constituent companies
The constituent companies when the IWWC was founded included:
 Holywells Water Works Company

Directors
The directors included:
 Richard Dykes Alexander

References

Ipswich
Former water companies of England
British companies established in 1854
Companies based in Ipswich